Orthocanthoides is a genus of tephritid  or fruit flies in the family Tephritidae.

Species
Orthocanthoides aristae Freidberg, 1987

References

Tephritinae
Tephritidae genera
Diptera of Africa